Ahaitz or Ahaize is a Basque place name referring to flat areas in mountain, favorable to human settlement.

It may refer to:
Ahaize, a hamlet of the commune of Ossès.
Ahaxe, a commune of the Pyrénées-Atlantiques.

It is at the origin of place names as:
Ahetze, a commune of the Pyrénées-Atlantiques and a former mande of Lower Navarre.
Ahaizparren: Hasparren, Azparren, Asparren
Aezkoa (Ahezcoa in 1137), a valley of Navarre.

Notes 

Place name element etymologies
Basque toponymy